Sekolah Menengah Kebangsaan Infant Jesus Convent, commonly referred to as Infant Jesus Convent (IJC) is a secondary school for girls in the city of Malacca, Malaysia. It is also sometimes referred to as the Main Convent or the French Convent (as opposed to the Portuguese Convent, Cannossa). SMK Infant Jesus Convent Malacca is a semi-government funded daily school. It is one of the 30 Convent secondary schools in Malaysia. As of 2008, IJC is the last remaining IJ Convent in Malaysia whose land is still under church authority.

Location
IJC is located on Parameswara Road in Malacca City, and is near the historic A Famosa fort and a number of shopping malls. It is situated exactly in front of SK Convent Infant Jesus 1 and 2, its primary sister schools.

Academics
Like other secondary schools, it offers lower and upper secondary educations: Form 1, 2, 3, 4 and 5. Forms 4 and 5 are split into 2 basic streams, Sciences and Humanities. The School also offers 6th Form education in Mathematics and Humanities.

Sport Houses
IJC four sport houses are named after the first four Principals: Anselm (red), Mathilde (blue), Leonard (green), Marcinenne (yellow).

Notable alumni
 Shirley Geok-lin Lim, author

References

External links
 https://web.archive.org/web/20080820064116/http://sekolah.mmu.edu.my/smkijc/lamanutama.htm Official website
 http://smkijc.110mb.com/ PTA Website

Catholic schools in Malaysia
Schools in Malacca
Convent of the Holy Infant Jesus schools
Secondary schools in Malaysia
Girls' schools in Malaysia